Angelito "Mang Lito" Antonio (born February 3, 1939) is a Filipino painter. He was born in Malolos, Bulacan. Since he was young, he was already earning titles and awards from various contests. He studied at the University of Santo Tomas (UST) and obtained his bachelor's degree in Fine Arts in 1963, he then became one of the faculties where he taught for many years. He is married to the artist Norma Belleza, with three children Marcel, Emil, and Fatima who are also painters.

Career
Studying art in the University of Santo Tomas, he has an art career that spans half a century. Some of the well-known painters were his teacher in the University, this includes: Manansala and Galo Ocampo. His colleagues included National Artist Ang Kiukok, Antonio Austria, Danilo Dalena, Mario Parial, Jaime de Guzman, and Norma Bellza (His wife). More than twenty local and international awards were to his credit, including the Grandprize (1964) and Third prize (1963) on AAP's Annual art competition and is a member of Art Association of the Philippines and the Saturday Group of Artists.

In 1977, Antonio first showed his works at the Luz gallery, Included in this exhibit are four sets of drawing with three to four paintings per set and his 12 monochromatic black and white paintings. Antonio is also a well-decorated artist, with numerous exhibits hosted abroad, particularly in New York and Saigon. Antonio's style takes roots from foreign artist Picasso. He had experimented greatly with colors to delineate his figures. His works' themes are taken extensively from folk genre. He is also one of the Masters of Modernism.

Antonio's more recent works see him moving toward abstraction, or a mix of the abstract and the figurative. He has been labeled both a modernist and an expressionist, successfully crafting an aesthetic that has allowed him to maintain his practice for over 50 years, exhibiting both here and abroad. He is probably one of the last pillars of Modernism, adhering to its core tenet of dynamic expression.

Exhibits and works
There are various exhibits that Antonio has entered; some of the few exhibits where as follows:

"La Musique" exhibit features Antonio, Cacnio, Rubio

An exhibition in Galerie Stephanie at Libis that displays the works by painters Angelito Antonio and Dominic Rubio and sculptor Michael Cacnio, Shows how to artforms- music and the visual arts- capture the ephemerality on the subject "La Musique."

Angelito Antonio's recent works on paper; Neil Gaiman winner exhibits at Liongoren.

Black and white is typically used to make an impulse visible in the language of art; it is also the medium with which words race across pages to concretely communicate one's thoughts.

One of the continuation form the new series where the pieces on craft paper he exhibited in 2013's "Pares-Pares", a group show featuring works of seven pairs of artist couples at Liongoren. This series treads between the abstract and the calligraphic that are similar to sketches, lending themselves more easily to story telling, without fully leaving the folk themes of his earlier pieces. Taking the aggression and dynamism of his expressionist tendencies a step further, they can be seen to mark a turning point in for Antonio, making it clear that he has earned the confidence to show work that runs closer to the bone.

Awards

In the Shell National Students Art Competition:

The Beginning is Green, in 1958, third prize
Kristo (Christ), in 1963, second prize
Mag-iisda (Fish Seller), in 1963, certificate of merit

From the Art Association of the Philippines:

Mananahi (Seamstress), in 1962, third prize
Deposition, in 1963, second prize
He, in 1969, honorable mention
Oracion (Evening Prayer), in 1970, first prize
Procession, 1970, special award
Pangarap sa Buhay, in 1972, major award
In the Travellers Life art competition, 1961, first prize
In the University of Santo Tomas 300th Anniversary, 1962, first prize
In the Travellers Art competition, in 1963, second prize
In the Philippine Airlines art contest, 1968, first prize
Thirteen Artist Award from the CCP in 1970
Patnubay ng Sining at Kalinangan Award by the City of Manila in 1984

Related to

Norma Belleza
Fatima Baquiran

See also

Vicente Manansala
Abstract Art
Modernism
University of Santo Tomas

Bibliography
"La Musique" exhibit features Antonio, Cacnio, Rubio. (September 29, 2014). Inquirer. Retrieved March 3, 2015.
Angelito Antonio's recent works on paper; Neil Gaiman winner exhibits at Liongoren. (November 24, 2013). Philippine Daily Inquirer. Retrieved March 3, 2015.

References

1939 births
Living people
Filipino painters
People from Malolos
Artists from Bulacan
University of Santo Tomas alumni